The 2022 Rhode Island Senate elections took place on November 8, 2022. Rhode Island voters elected 38 state senators to the Rhode Island Senate. State senators served two-year terms in the Rhode Island Senate.

Background 
Postal voting became easier for voters after a bill passed in the State House in May 2022.

Incumbent senators

Predictions

See also 

 2022 United States elections
 2022 United States House of Representatives elections in Rhode Island
 2022 Rhode Island House of Representatives election

References 

House
Rhode Island House
Rhode Island Senate elections